A Barrel Full of Dollars also known as Coffin Full of Dollars  is a 1971 Italian Western film directed by Demofilo Fidani and starring Jack Betts.

Cast
 Hunt Powers – Tamayo
 Gordon Mitchell – John
 Ray Saunders – Sam
 Simone Blondel – Monica Benson
 Dennis Colt – Ramirez
 Dean Reese – Charles Benson
 Klaus Kinski – Hagen
 Jeff Cameron – George 'Nevada Kid' Hamilton
 Lorenzo Arbore – Sheriff
 Lucky McMurray
 Custer Gail

References

External links

1971 films
1971 Western (genre) films
1970s Italian-language films
Spaghetti Western films
Films directed by Demofilo Fidani
Films scored by Lallo Gori
1970s Italian films